Stanley Keith Pearl (21 December 1893 – 9 August 1986) was an Australian sapper with the First Australian Imperial Force during World War I. Stanley Keith Pearl was born on 21 December 1893 in Ulverstone, Tasmania, the youngest child of Charles Pearl and Sophia Ann Wells. After enlisting at the town of Ulverstone in Tasmania on 9 November 1915 at twenty-one years of age, Pearl, in August 1916, became a sapper with the Australian 5 Field Company Engineers. He performed this role for the duration of the war.

World War I 

Pearl was a joiner by trade whose father was Charles Pearl of Ulverstone, Tasmania. Pearl was Anglican. He embarked from Sydney to Alexandria and then the Western Front (World War I) in France aboard HMAT Orsova on 11 March 1916. He undertook a brief stint with the 8 Field Company Engineers (Reinforcement 4) before joining the 5 Field Company Engineers. Pearl's Victory Medal (United Kingdom) and British War Medal are held in the Australian War Memorial's collection.

Pearl produced a phenomenal collection of trench art between 1916 and 1919. Pearl donated his trench art objects to the Australian War Memorial but whether this reflects the full extent of that which he produced in the context of war remains a mystery. A total of fifteen of Pearl's oeuvre are held in the Australian War Memorial's Military Heraldry collection. Military shell cases, other parts of shells, badges and buttons were just some of the war-related materials used by Pearl to assemble everyday objects such as a clock, a map of Tasmania and a hat pin stand, as is evidenced by the accessibility and digitisation of his work on the War Memorial's online collection (see external links for selection of images). One can become more familiar with Pearl's work through such a collection as it displays images of the objects together with Pearl's own field notes. The accompanying field notes that Pearl documented alongside each piece are fascinating as this was not a feature typically associated with First World War trench art. Pearl used matter-of-fact language where tales of death became mere descriptions. Pearl's field notes and his details on the First World War embarkation roll are useful additional primary sources for historians, art historians and anthropologists.

Post-war and legacy

There is no evidence to suggest that Pearl is survived by anyone, nor have any photographs of him been discovered. He is an "enigma." It is therefore Pearl's material existence in the form of trench art that survives, the power of which is subsequently elevated. The creative and artistic vision of Pearl to contribute to the material culture of World War I, of which trench art is a fascinating example, has meant that his name lives on through these well-crafted, striking objects. Pearl was unconsciously engaging with features of material culture such as bricolage and recyclia in producing trench art. The fact that he was a joiner pre-war also speaks to this refined, craftsmanship-like quality to his pieces.

Pearl survived World War I. During March 1919, Pearl returned to Tasmania, although soon relocated to Canberra. He began working for the Australian War Memorial in 1941, the year that it opened, and continued to do so until he retired. He worked as a carpenter and senior tradesman at the War Memorial. The electoral roll details Pearl's exact position at the War Memorial as an ‘installation manager.’ Such hands-on employment echoes his pre-war occupation as a joiner. Pearl passed away at Woden Valley Hospital, Canberra, on 9 August 1986 at the age of 92 years, leaving his wife Gertrude Iris a widow. Previously, she was married to Ernest Tasman Pearl (Stanley's brother); Stanley was previously married to Doris Jean Hobbs who died in 1965 

A recent exhibition entitled Sappers & Shrapnel: Contemporary Art and the Art of the Trenches at the Art Gallery of South Australia showcased Pearl's trench art. The exhibition presented Pearl's pieces alongside other First World War trench art objects and more recent works of art that reflected on war today. Such a display, in bringing together the historical and the contemporary, was the first opportunity whereby the trench art of Pearl was exposed to a wider audience. It is evidence that Pearl and his trench art collection hold an important relevance today and will continue to do so in the future, especially in studies of history, art history and anthropology.

Footnotes

Works

 Trench Art Chrysanthemum Vase, 1918-19
 Trench Art Clock, March 1918
 Trench Art Hat Pin Stand, May 1918
 Trench Art Map of Tasmania, 1917

Bibliography
 The Australian Imperial Force (AIF) Project. "Stanley Keith Pearl." (n.d.) https://www.aif.adfa.edu.au/showPerson?pid=237003. University of New South Wales (UNSW) Canberra, Australian Defence Force Academy. Accessed 29 April 2017.
 Australian War Memorial collection. "Collections search: Sapper Stanley Keith Pearl." https://www.awm.gov.au/search/all/?query=sapper+stanley+keith+pearl&submit=&op=Search&format=list&section%5B0%5D=collections. Accessed 4 March 2017.
 Australian War Memorial collection. "British War Medal 1914-20: Sapper S K Pearl, 5 Field Company Engineers, AIF." https://www.awm.gov.au/collection/REL/21088.001. Accessed 29 April 2017.
 Australian War Memorial collection. "Victory Medal: Sapper S K Pearl, 5 Field Company Engineers, AIF." https://www.awm.gov.au/collection/REL/21088.002. Accessed 29 April 2017.
 Australian War Memorial. "First World War Embarkation Rolls: Stanley Keith Pearl." https://www.awm.gov.au/people/rolls/R1778164/. Accessed 4 March 2017.
 Kratz, Corinne A. "Rethinking Recyclia." African Arts 28, no. 3 (Summer 1995): 1,7,8, 10–12.
 Mitzevich, Nick. "Director’s Foreword." In Sappers & Shrapnel: Contemporary Art and the Art of the Trenches, Lisa Slade, 8–11. Adelaide: Art Gallery of South Australia, 2016.
 Neale, Kerry. "Decoration from Destruction: the First World War Trench Art of Sapper Pearl." Australian War Memorial, 28 April 2016. https://www.awm.gov.au/blog/2016/04/28/decoration-destruction-first-world-war-trench-art-sapper-pearl/. Accessed 5 March 2017.
 Saunders, Nicholas J. "Bodies of Metal, Shells of Memory: ‘Trench Art’, and the Great War Re-cycled." Journal of Material Culture 5, no. 1 (2000): 43-67. 
 Saunders, Nicholas J. "Sapper Stanley Keith Pearl." In Sappers & Shrapnel: Contemporary Art and the Art of the Trenches, Lisa Slade, 13–39. Adelaide: Art Gallery of South Australia, 2016.
 Slade, Lisa. Sappers and Shrapnel: Contemporary Art and the Art of the Trenches. South Australia: Art Gallery of South Australia, 2016.
 Slade, Lisa. "Trench Art: Sappers and Shrapnel – On Trench Art and Material Culture in Contemporary Art." Art & War: Badlands. In Artlink 35, no. 1 (March 2015): n.p.

Further reading
 Appadurai, Arjun. "Introduction: Commodities and the Politics of Value." In The Social Life of Things: Commodities in Cultural Perspective, edited by Arjun Appadurai, 3-63. Cambridge: Cambridge University Press, 1986.
 Prown, Jules David. "Mind in Matter: An Introduction to Material Culture Theory and Method." Winterthur Portfolio 17, no. 1 (Spring 1982): 1–19.
 Saunders, Nicholas J. "Apprehending Memory: Material Culture and War, 1919-1939." In The Great World War 1914-1945 - Volume 2: The Peoples’ Experience, edited by Dr. Peter Liddle, Dr. John Bourne and Dr. Ian Whitehead, 476–488. London: Harper Collins Publishers, 2001.
 Saunders, Nicholas J. Trench Art: Materialities and Memories of War. Oxford: Berg, 2003.

External links 

 Australian War Memorial
 Sapper Stanley Keith Pearl, Australian War Memorial
 The Art Gallery of South Australia
 Sappers & Shrapnel: Contemporary Art and the Art of the Trenches exhibition, The Art Gallery of South Australia

Military art
Trench warfare
Recycling
Australian military personnel of World War I
Australian Army soldiers
Australian war artists